The Imperial Academy in the old capital city Huế was the national academy during the Nguyễn dynasty of Đại Nam.

History
After the unification of Vietnam, Emperor Gia Long decided to move the capital from Hanoi to Huế. Following this decision, in 1803, a new Confucian academy was built in order to replace the Lê dynasty's Quốc Tử giám. The first academy, called Đốc Học đường, was a small block of buildings located at An Ninh Thượng village, Hương Trà district, some 5 kilometres east of Huế. It stood next to a Văn miếu.

By March 1820, emperor Thánh Tổ changed the academy name into Thành Quân quán (Imperial Academy) and had the buildings rebuilt. He also expanded the academy by building the Di Luân Palace which consisted of one teaching hall, two teaching rooms and 19 classrooms.

Under the reign of emperor Tự Đức, the academy was enlarged again. The emperor had a wall built around the academy and visit the academy by himself. Tự Đức also built a stone stele which contains his commandments for students. In 1904, Imperial Academy of Huế was badly damaged by a hurricane but was repaired soon after.

In 1908, under the reign of emperor Duy Tân, the Imperial Academy of Huế was moved into Imperial City, Huế (its present location). Almost all buildings was completely rebuilt except the Di Luân Palace.

In 1945, following the fall of Nguyễn dynasty, the academy was permanently closed.

References 

Sources
 

 

19th-century mosques
Buildings and structures in Huế
Confucianism in Vietnam
School buildings completed in 1803